Hornindalsrokken is a  tall mountain in Møre og Romsdal county, Norway. It is located on the border of two municipalities: Stranda Municipality and Volda Municipality.  The mountain is sometimes also called Honndalsrokken or sometimes just Rokken or Rokkjen.

The easiest ways to climb the mountain are from the Sæterdalen valley in Hornindal Municipality or from the Kjellstaddalen valley in Stranda Municipality.  A popular viewpoint of the summit is from the Honndøla bridge which was built in 1810.  The bridge lies near Norwegian County Road 60 in Indre Hornindal.  North of the mountain lies the lake Tyssevatnet which is the innermost lake in the Hjørundfjorden area.

See also
List of mountains of Norway

References

External links
 
 Local tourist association, page on Hornindalsrokken

Mountains of Møre og Romsdal
Volda
Stranda